"Lo malo" (previously known as "Chico malo") is a song by Spanish singers Aitana and Ana Guerra, originally written in English language under the title "Boy No Good" by Tye Morgan and Will Simms and adapted into Spanish language by Brisa Fenoy. It was first released on January 28, 2018 as one of the candidate songs to represent Spain in the Eurovision Song Contest 2018, but it finished in third place and "Tu canción" was selected. A revamped version was released on April 6, 2018. The single topped the Spanish Singles Chart and received a fivefold platinum certification. A remix version featuring Colombian singer Greeicy and Argentine singer Tini was released on August 24, 2018.

Eurovision Song Contest

On 4 December 2017, the Spanish broadcaster Televisión Española (TVE) confirmed that they would use the successful music reality program Operación Triunfo to select their act for the Eurovision Song Contest 2018. It was later revealed on 20 December that the final five singers of the program's ninth series would perform in "Gala Eurovisión", which would be where the Spanish public would choose both the song and its performers for the Eurovision Song Contest. The nine competing songs were unveiled on 23 January 2018. "Lo malo" was first presented as "Chico malo", but the song's title was changed two days later because of copyright issues. Gala Eurovisión was held on 29 January. "Lo malo" was one of the top three songs in the first round of voting, qualifying to the second round where it placed third with 26% of the vote.

The Spanish branch of OGAE, the international fan club of the Eurovision Song Contest, selected “Lo malo” to represent Spain in the visual event OGAE Second Chance Contest in 2018.

Track listing

Charts

Weekly charts

Year-end charts

Certifications

Release history

Other media

In April 2018, Inditex-owned brand Stradivarius released a T-shirt inspired by the song which was sold out in less than twenty four hours.

References

Spanish songs
Spanish-language songs
2018 songs
2018 debut singles
Number-one singles in Spain
Aitana (singer) songs
Songs written by Will Simms